Albania participated at the 2017 Summer Universiade in Taipei, Taiwan with 2 competitors in 1 sport.

Athletics

Men

Women

References
Results

External links 
 Albania Overview

Nations at the 2017 Summer Universiade
2017 in Albanian sport